Hopper wagon may refer to:
 Hopper car
 Hopper wagon

See also 
 Gravity wagon, also called a slant wagon